National Secondary Route 246, or just Route 246 (or ) is a National Road Route of Costa Rica, located in the Puntarenas province.

Description
In Puntarenas province the route covers Buenos Aires canton (Buenos Aires, Potrero Grande districts), Coto Brus canton (Pittier district).

References

Highways in Costa Rica